Rapture is the debut extended play by Jamaican pop singer Koffee. It was released on 14 March 2019 on Columbia Records under the copyright of Sony Music UK subdivision, Promised Land Recordings. In spite of having a minority of actual Reggae content, Rapture won the Grammy Award for Best Reggae Album at the 62nd Annual Grammy Awards, making Koffee both the first female and youngest artist (at 19 years old) to win the award. After being nominated, Koffee stated: "I'm very honored, I'm very happy and very satisfied. I put a lot of work into my first project and to see that it has been recognized on this level has really fulfilled me so I'm very thankful."

Rapture debuted atop the US Billboard Top Reggae Albums chart, staying there for 32 weeks.

The song "Toast" received a music video.

Track listing

Charts

References

2019 debut EPs
Grammy Award for Best Reggae Album
Reggae EPs